In leathercraft, a pricking iron is a handheld tool resembling a fork which is used to create guide holes in leather which must then be opened up with an awl before the piece can be stitched.  A pricking iron is different from a leather chisel in that a chisel is designed to create the entire set of holes, not just the guides for then, and does not require follow-up with an awl.

References

 Leather